European Parliament elections were held in Gibraltar (which formed part of the European Parliament constituency of South West England). 23 May 2019 as part of the EU-wide elections after the date of EU withdrawal was delayed by the UK Government.

Background

Gibraltar's European Union Withdrawal Act was passed in March 2019 with the support of the governing GSLP–Liberal coalition and an independent MP. The opposition Gibraltar Social Democrats originally did not intend to support the bill but later voted for it, but against parts of the legislation.

The withdrawal agreement is supported by the governing GSLP-Liberal coalition, but opposed by the opposition Gibraltar Social Democrats.

According to the Gibraltar newspaper Panorama, there had been a rise in Euroscepticism in Gibraltar since Spain was given a veto by the EU over Gibraltar's participation in the withdrawal agreement.

Campaign
Candidates from the Brexit Party, Liberal Democrats, English Democrats and UKIP visited Gibraltar to campaign in the elections.  The Liberal Democrat lead candidate for the constituency accepted that there was "anger and frustration" with regards to the EU's actions towards Gibraltar after the referendum result, but stated that she felt the party's anti-Brexit message was being received well.

Brexit Party candidate, James Glancy expressed concerns over the ramifications for Gibraltar of European federalisation, the Common Security and Defence Policy and influence of Spanish politicians in the EU in the event that Brexit would not happen.

Result
The result was a win for the Liberal Democrats, reflecting "clearly pro-EU and pro Remain" sentiment and with the Brexit Party taking second place, which "reflects not just frustration with the stagnated Brexit process, but also anger at the way the EU has backed Spain during the withdrawal negotiations", according to the Gibraltar Chronicle.

See also
2019 European Parliament election in the United Kingdom

References

Gibraltar
European Parliament elections in Gibraltar
European